The 2007 World Professional Billiards Championship, the top international professional competition in English billiards, was held between 18 and 22 July 2007 at the Northern Snooker Centre in Leeds, England. The 16 players were divided into four groups of four, with the top two in each group advancing into the knock-out round.

Mike Russell won his eighth World Professional Billiards Championship title, by defeating Chris Shutt 2166–1710 in the final.

Prize fund
  
Winner: £6,000
Runner-up: £2,750
Semi-final: £1,500
Quarter-final: £750
Group losers: £400
Highest break: £350
Total: £18,300

Group round

Group A

Group B

Group C

Group D

Knock-out round

References

2007
World Professional Billiards Championship
World Professional Billiards Championship
Sports competitions in Leeds
July 2007 sports events in the United Kingdom
Cue sports in the United Kingdom